D75-4590 is an antifungal pyridobenzimidazole derivative that inhibits β-glucan synthesis. D11-2040 and D21-6076 are antifungal derivatives of D75-4590.

References

Antifungals
Diethylamino compounds
Heterocyclic compounds with 3 rings
Nitrogen heterocycles
Nitriles